John Peter McGrath (1 June 1935 – 22 January 2002) was a British playwright and theatre theorist who took up the cause of Socialism in his plays.

Early life and career
From an Irish Catholic background, McGrath was born in Birkenhead, and educated in Mold and, after his National Service, at St John's College, Oxford. During the early 1960s he worked for the BBC, and wrote and directed many of the early episodes of the corporation's police series Z-Cars which began in 1962.

Theatrical career
McGrath is best remembered as a playwright and for his theoretical formulation of the principles of a radical, popular theatre. The 7:84 Theatre Company was established in 1971 by McGrath, his wife (Elizabeth MacLennan) and her brother (David MacLennan), and The Cheviot, the Stag, and the Black Black Oil (1973), his best-known play, was created with these principles in mind. It utilizes some of the dramaturgical and theatrical techniques of epic theatre – actors take on multiple roles and frequently slip out of character – of the type associated with the German dramatist Bertolt Brecht, but which McGrath argued have a genealogy that stretches far further back through the history of popular traditions of performance. The title of the play refers to three pivotal periods in the history of class struggle in Scotland: the clearing of the Scottish highlands to make way for grazing land, the subsequent use of this land by the wealthy for shooting, and its current exploitation in the oil market. These changes are identified as forming a recurrent pattern of abuse of the land and the exploitation of the people by outsiders and by wealthier locals. It was broadcast in the BBC's Play for Today series in 1974.

He adapted the satirical morality play A Satire of the Three Estates (1540) by David Lyndsay as a contemporary morality A Satire of the Four Estaites, which was presented by Wildcat Theatre Company at the Edinburgh International Conference Centre as part of the Edinburgh International Festival in 1996. This production opened on 16 August 1996 and featured Sylvester McCoy.

Personal life
In 1962 he had married Elizabeth MacLennan, the Scottish actress, whom he had met while they were both at Oxford University; the couple had two sons and a daughter.

Death
McGrath died from leukemia in January 2002. In McGrath's obituary published by The Guardian, Michael Billington wrote: "No one since Joan Littlewood did more to advance the cause of popular theatre in Britain than John McGrath".

Reviews
 Paterson, Tony (1981), Four Decades of Drama, including a review of Two Plays for the Eighties, in Cencrastus No. 7, Winter 1981–82, pp. 43 & 44, 
 Lacey, Stephen (1982), review of A Good Night Out: Popular Theatre - Audience, Class and Form and The Cheviot, the Stag and the Black, Black Oil, in Cencrastus No. 8,  Spring 1982, pp. 40 & 41,

References

Sources
 Kershaw, Baz. 1992. The Politics of Performance: Radical Theatre as Cultural Intervention. London and New York: Routledge. .
 MacLennan, Elizabeth. 1990. The Moon Belongs to Everyone: Making Theatre with 7:84. London: Methuen. .
 McGrath, John. 1981. A Good Night Out: Popular Theatre: Audience, Class and Form. London: Nick Hern Books, 1996. .
 McGrath, John. 1990. The Bone Won't Break: On Theatre and Hope in Hard Times. London: Methuen. .
 McGrath, John. 1996. Six-Pack: Plays for Scotland. Edinburgh: Polygon. .
 Schechter, Joel, ed. 2003. Popular Theatre: A Sourcebook. Worlds of Performance Ser. London and New York: Routledge. .

Externals
John McGrath on IMDb

1935 births
2002 deaths
English socialists

Political history of Scotland
Scottish nationalists
English male dramatists and playwrights
20th-century English dramatists and playwrights
20th-century English male writers